Sagbama is a Local Government Area in Bayelsa State, Southern part of Nigeria. Its headquarters are in the town of Sagbama. Part of the area of the LGA lies within the Bayelsa National Forest.

It has an area of 945 km and a population of 187,146 at the 2006 census.
Sagbama LGA is in the town of Sagbama and consists of the districts of Ofoni, Aduku, Sagbama, Ossiama, OFONI, Adoni, Agbere, Asamabiri, Angalabiri, Ebedebiri, Osekwenike, Agoro, Toru Ebeni and Trofani, and the LGA is under Bayelsa West Senatorial District

The postal code of the area is 561.  It was reported that a man killed in his roommate  at Sagbama,  in Sagbama local government area of Bayelsa state and sell his body part to rituals.

Climate
In Sagbama community, the wet season is warm and overcast, the dry season is hot and mostly cloudy, and it is oppressive year round. Over the course of the year, the temperature typically varies from 70 °F to 88 °F and is rarely below 62 °F or above 91 °F.

Major Communities in Sagbama Local Government Area, Bayelsa State:

SALGA Constituency 1 
1. OFONI

2. ANGALABIRI

3. TORU ORUA

4. EBEDEBIRI

5. TORU ANGIAMA

6. BULOU ORUA

SALGA Constituency 2 
7. OGOBIRI

8. SAGBAMA

9. AGOROGBENE

10. AGORO

11. OKUMBIRI

12. TORU-EBENI

13. ERIAMA

14. OSIAMA

15. KABIAMA

16. AKEDE

17. DAGANA-GBENE

18. EGBEPULUGBENE

19. EWEGBENE

20. OGBONUGBENE

21. ANYAMA-IBENI

22. ISONI

SALGA Constituency 3 
23. TUNGBABIRI

24. ADAGBABIRI

25. ELEMEBIRI

26. TROFANI

27. ISOKENIKE

28. ODONI

29. AGBARE

30. TUNGBO

31. ANIBEZE

32. OSIFO

33. ADUKU

34. KENAN

35. OBUITOR

36. EKPERIWARE

37. OGBOKIRI

38. ASAMABIRI

References

Local Government Areas in Bayelsa State